The Algyő oil field is an oil field located in Algyő, Csongrád County, in Hungary. It was discovered in 1965 and developed by MOL Group. It began production in 1965 and produces oil. The total proven reserves of the Algyő oil field are approximately 629 million barrels (84×106tonnes). It provides nearly half of Hungary's crude oil.

References

Oil fields in Hungary